Rabab Cheddar (born 7 March 1991) is a Moroccan boxer. She competed in the women's flyweight event at the 2020 Summer Olympics.

References

External links
 
 
 

1991 births
Living people
Moroccan women boxers
Olympic boxers of Morocco
Boxers at the 2020 Summer Olympics
Place of birth missing (living people)